James Orr may refer to:

 James Orr (footballer) (1871–1942), Scottish footballer
 James Orr (poet) (1770–1816), poet from Ulster
 James Orr (courtier) (1917–2008), private secretary to the Duke of Edinburgh
 James Orr (theologian) (1844–1913), Scottish theological writer, editor of ISBE, 1915
 James Orr (umpire) (1868–1940), Australian test cricket umpire
 James Orr (Canadian politician) (1826–1905), Member of the Legislative Assembly of British Columbia for the riding of New Westminster
 James Orr (filmmaker) (born 1953), Canadian screenwriter, film director and producer
 Jimmy Orr (1935–2020), American football wide receiver
 J. Edwin Orr (1912–1987), Baptist minister, lecturer and author
 James Lawrence Orr (1822–1873), American politician